The 18009 / 18010 Santragachi–Ajmer Weekly Express is an Express train belonging to South Eastern Railway zone that runs between  and  in India. It is currently being operated with 18009/18010 train numbers on a weekly basis.

Service

 18009 Santragachi–Ajmer Weekly Express has an average speed of 50 km/hr and covers 1986 km in 39h 55m.
 18010 Ajmer–Santragachi Weekly Express has an average speed of 51 km/hr and covers 1986 km in 39h 00m.

Route & Halts

Coach composition

The train has Modern LHB rakes with a max speed of 130 kmph. The train consists of 22 coaches:

 2 AC II Tier
 6 AC III Tier
 10 Sleeper Coaches 
 2 General Unreserved
 2 End on Generation (EOG) Coaches

Traction

Both trains are hauled by a -based WAP-4 locomotive from end to end

Rake sharing

The train shares its rake with, 
 22829/22830 Shalimar–Bhuj Weekly Superfast Express 
 22825/22826 Shalimar–Chennai Central Weekly SF Express  
 22851/22852 Santragachi–Mangalore Central Vivek Express.

Direction reversal

The train reverses its direction 3 times:

 
 
 Chanderiya Railway Station

See also 

 Ajmer Junction railway station
 Santragachi Junction railway station
 Shalimar–Chennai Central Weekly SF Express
 Shalimar–Bhuj Weekly Superfast Express
 Santragachi–Mangalore Central Vivek Express

Notes

References

External links 

 18009/Santragachi–Ajmer Weekly Express
 18010/Ajmer–Santragachi Weekly Express

Rail transport in Howrah
Transport in Ajmer
Express trains in India
Rail transport in West Bengal
Rail transport in Jharkhand
Rail transport in Madhya Pradesh
Rail transport in Rajasthan
Railway services introduced in 2017